Desyat Negrityat ('Ten Little Negroes') is a 1987 Soviet film adaptation of Agatha Christie's 1939 novel of the same name, now known as And Then There Were None. It was directed by Stanislav Govorukhin, who also penned the script.
  
This version was, upon its release, unique in that virtually no part of the novel is altered (although a sexual relationship between Vera and Lombard is introduced, and the latter's revolver is changed into a small automatic pistol). Unlike the previous Hollywood/British adaptations of the story, none of the characters or their respective crimes are altered in any way and the film concludes with the grim finale from Agatha Christie's original novel, rather than the upbeat ending from the 1943 stage version that most other adaptations chose to follow. The Soviet adaptation is a bit more fanciful in that the murderer expounds at some length, in solitude, about their methodology and the critical twist (aloud instead of on paper as in the novel).

Plot 
On a hot, early August day sometime in the late 1930s, eight people arrive on a small, isolated island off the Devon coast of England. Each appears to have an invitation tailored to his or her personal circumstances, such as an offer of employment or an unexpected late summer holiday. They are met by Thomas and Ethel Rogers, the butler and cook/housekeeper, who state that their hosts, Mr Ulick Norman Owen and his wife Mrs Una Nancy Owen, whom they have not yet met in person, have not arrived, but left instructions, which strikes all the guests as odd.

Cast 

Vladimir Zeldin as Judge Lawrence Wargrave
Tatyana Drubich as Vera Claythorne
Alexander Kaidanovsky as Philip Lombard
Aleksei Zharkov as Detective William Blore
Anatoli Romashin as Doctor Armstrong
Lyudmila Maksakova as Emily Brent
Mikhail Gluzsky as General MacArthur
Aleksei Zolotnitsky as Mr. Rogers
Irina Tereshchenko as Mrs. Rogers
Aleksandr Abdulov as Anthony Marston
Igor Yasulovich as Accuser's voice on a phonograph record

Locations
The film was shot in Crimea, utilizing the peninsula's two famous mansions, the Swallow's Nest and the Vorontsov Palace. However, when the house is seen on a cliff in the exterior scenes, it is actually a scale model, shot with actors using forced perspective. The stone staircase leading up to the house was filmed at Diva Rock.

References

External links
 
 Desyat Negrityat. Secrets of cinema (2014). Documentary film. In Russian

1987 films
1980s crime films
Films based on And Then There Were None
Films shot in Crimea
1980s Russian-language films
Films directed by Stanislav Govorukhin
Soviet crime films
Odesa Film Studio films